Elgin J. Davis (born October 23, 1965) is a former professional American football running back for the New England Patriots in the National Football League (NFL).

Davis was drafted by the New England Patriots in 1987, becoming the second player ever drafted out of the University of Central Florida. Davis played two seasons with the Patriots before signing with the Pittsburgh Steelers and later the Winnipeg Blue Bombers of the Canadian Football League (CFL).

References

External links
 Elgin Davis website

1965 births
Living people
Jean Ribault High School alumni
Players of American football from Jacksonville, Florida
American football running backs
UCF Knights football players
New England Patriots players
Pittsburgh Steelers players
National Football League replacement players